José Paulo Sousa da Silva (born 13 May 1975), known as Paulo Sousa, is a Portuguese former professional footballer who played mainly as a defensive midfielder.

Club career
Sousa was born in Lousada, Porto District. During his career he played for S.C. Freamunde, F.C. Penafiel and F.C. Paços de Ferreira, also having an unsuccessful spell with Cyprus' APOP Kinyras FC from August to December 2007, after which he returned to Paços and re-joined central midfield teammate Pedrinha, with whom he shared nine professional seasons.

In June 2011, after two injury-ravaged campaigns with Paços, Sousa retired from football at the age of 36, amassing Primeira Liga totals of 183 matches and three goals for the club. He made his debut in the top flight on 12 August 2001, playing the full 90 minutes in a 3–1 home win against C.F. Os Belenenses.

References

External links

1975 births
Living people
People from Lousada
Sportspeople from Porto District
Portuguese footballers
Association football midfielders
Primeira Liga players
Liga Portugal 2 players
Segunda Divisão players
S.C. Freamunde players
F.C. Penafiel players
F.C. Paços de Ferreira players
Cypriot First Division players
APOP Kinyras FC players
Portuguese expatriate footballers
Expatriate footballers in Cyprus
Portuguese expatriate sportspeople in Cyprus